F.C. Daburiyya, also known as Hapoel Daburiyya) is an Israeli football club based in Daburiyya. The club is currently in Liga Bet North B division.

History
The club was founded in 2008 as a replacement for the Hapoel Daburiyya club, which operated from the mid-1960s and folded in 2006. The new club joined Liga Gimel Jerzreel division, which it won in 2010–11, promoting to Liga Bet North B division, where they played ever since.

Honours

League

1As Hapoel Daburiyya

Cup competitions

External links
F.C. Daburiyya Israel Football Association 
Hapoel Daburiyya Israel Football Association

References

Football clubs in Israel
Hapoel football clubs
Association football clubs established in 2008
Association football clubs disestablished in 2021
2008 establishments in Israel
2021 disestablishments in Israel
Arab-Israeli football clubs